The Vietoris–Begle mapping theorem is a result in the mathematical field of algebraic topology. It is named for Leopold Vietoris and Edward G. Begle. The statement of the theorem, below, is as formulated by Stephen Smale.

Theorem
Let  and  be compact metric spaces, and let  be surjective and continuous.
 for all  and all ,
with  denoting the th reduced Vietoris homology group. Then, the induced homomorphism

Note that as stated the theorem doesn't hold for homology theories like singular homology. For example, Vietoris homology groups of the closed topologist's sine curve and of a segment are isomorphic (since the first projects onto the second with acyclic fibers). But the singular homology differs, since the segment is path connected and the topologist's sine curve is not.

References
"Leopold Vietoris (1891–2002)", Notices of the American Mathematical Society, vol. 49, no. 10 (November 2002) by Heinrich Reitberger

Theorems in algebraic topology